"Feel Invincible" is the lead single from the 2016 album, Unleashed, by the American Christian rock band Skillet, and is the first track on the album. It was released on June 29, 2016. The song became Skillet's first Hot Christian Songs No. 1 single.

Background
On May 20, 2016, Feel Invincible was released as the lead single for Skillet's ninth album, Unleashed. The track is about feeling untouchable with the power of God. In an interview with Billboard, Cooper spoke on the importance of the track for the album:

The track was chosen as the theme for TBS' E-League, an eight-week live video-gaming competition broadcast in more than 80 countries. On July 7, WWE announced that it had chosen "Feel Invincible" as an official theme for the 2016 Battleground pay-per-view event.

Composition
In an interview with iHeartRadio, Skillet revealed that "Feel Invincible" was about finding something that gets you through another day.

Music video
A music video for "Feel Invincible" was released on June 29, 2016. In the visual, the band is dressed entirely in black, with all black guitars, bass and drum kit while playing in a dimly lit warehouse in front of a gray-burst backdrop. Peculiar characters ranging from gas masked figures, samurai warriors and more covered entirely in black also appear throughout the video.

Track listing
Digital download
"Feel Invincible" – 3:49
Digital download (KELLR remix)
"Feel Invincible" – 3:11
Digital download (Doug Weier remix)
"Feel Invincible" – 3:32
Digital download (81Neutronz remix)
"Feel Invincible" – 4:01
Digital download (blastforever remix)
"Feel Invincible" – 3:48
Digital download (Noise Revolution remix)
"Feel Invincible" – 3:59

Credits and personnel
Credits adapted from Genius.

 John Cooper – songwriting
 Seth Mosley – songwriting, programming
 Zachary Kelm – producer
 Brian Howes – producer
 Korey Cooper — programming
 Jason "JVP" Van Poederooyen – mastering engineering, programming
 Scott Skrzynski  — mixing assistant
 Neal Avron — mixing engineering

Charts

Weekly charts

Year-end charts

Certifications

References

2016 singles
2016 songs
Skillet (band) songs
Songs written by John Cooper (musician)
Songs written by Seth Mosley